Baseball, for the 2013 Bolivarian Games, took place from 17 November to 24 November 2013.

Medalists

Participating teams

Group stage

References

Events at the 2013 Bolivarian Games
2013 in baseball
2013 Bolivarian Games